The 2005–06 San Antonio Spurs season was the team's 30th overall season, the 33rd in San Antonio, and the 30th in the NBA. The Spurs entered the season as the defending NBA champions, having defeated the Detroit Pistons in the 2005 NBA Finals in seven games, winning their third NBA championship. They began the season hoping to improve upon their 59–23 output from the previous season. They bested it by four games, finishing 63–19, and qualified for the playoffs for the ninth straight season. After defeating the Sacramento Kings by six games in the first round, the defending champions faced their in-state rival Dallas Mavericks. They were pushed to seven games and the Spurs ended up losing the deciding game of the series. 

Tim Duncan and Tony Parker were selected to play in the 2006 NBA All-Star Game in Houston. This is Parker's first All-Star game appearance.

Draft picks

Roster

Regular season

Season standings

Game log

Regular season 

|- bgcolor="#ccffcc"
| 1
| November 1
| Denver
| 
| Tony Parker (26)
| Tim Duncan (10)
| Tim Duncan (6)
| SBC Center18,797
| 1–0
|- bgcolor="#ccffcc"
| 2
| November 4
| Cleveland
| 
| Tim Duncan (21)
| Tim Duncan (10)
| Tony Parker (8)
| SBC Center18,797
| 2–0
|- bgcolor="#ffcccc"
| 3
| November 5
| @ Dallas
| 
| Tony Parker (24)
| Tim Duncan (12)
| Tim Duncan (5)
| American Airlines Center20,468
| 2–1
|- bgcolor="#ccffcc"
| 4
| November 7
| @ Chicago
| 
| Tim Duncan (24)
| Tim Duncan (16)
| Tony Parker (9)
| United Center21,827
| 3–1
|- bgcolor="#ccffcc"
| 5
| November 9
| @ Charlotte
| 
| Tim Duncan (29)
| Tim Duncan (10)
| Tony Parker (6)
| Charlotte Bobcats Arena17,237
| 4–1
|- bgcolor="#ccffcc"
| 6
| November 11
| @ Boston
| 
| Tim Duncan (29)
| Tim Duncan (12)
| Tony Parker (6)
| TD Banknorth Garden18,624
| 5–1
|- bgcolor="#ffcccc"
| 7
| November 12
| @ Washington
| 
| Manu Ginóbili (28)
| Tim Duncan (14)
| Tony Parker (6)
| MCI Center20,173
| 5–2
|- bgcolor="#ccffcc"
| 8
| November 15
| Atlanta
| 
| Manu Ginóbili (24)
| Fabricio Oberto (8)
| Tony Parker (8)
| SBC Center18,797
| 6–2
|- bgcolor="#ccffcc"
| 9
| November 17
| Houston
| 
| Tim Duncan (19)
| Tim Duncan (9)
| Tony Parker (8)
| SBC Center18,797
| 7–2
|- bgcolor="#ccffcc"
| 10
| November 19
| Phoenix
| 
| Tim Duncan (24)
| Tim Duncan (13)
| Bruce Bowen (4)
| SBC Center18,797
| 8–2
|- bgcolor="#ccffcc"
| 11
| November 21
| @ Sacramento
| 
| Tony Parker (23)
| Tim Duncan (19)
| Tim Duncan, Manu Ginóbili (4)
| ARCO Arena17,317
| 9–2
|- bgcolor="#ccffcc"
| 12
| November 23
| @ Golden State
| 
| Tony Parker (26)
| Tim Duncan (12)
| Tony Parker (6)
| Oakland Arena18,768
| 10–2
|- bgcolor="#ffcccc"
| 13
| November 25
| Chicago
| 
| Tim Duncan (24)
| Tim Duncan (11)
| Tony Parker (6)
| SBC Center18,797
| 10–3
|- bgcolor="#ccffcc"
| 14
| November 29
| L. A. Lakers
| 
| Manu Ginóbili (22)
| Tim Duncan (9)
| Tim Duncan, Tony Parker (5)
| SBC Center18,797
| 11–3

|- bgcolor="#ccffcc"
| 15
| December 1 
| @ Dallas
| 
| Tony Parker (30)
| Tim Duncan (14)
| Tony Parker (5)
| American Airlines Center20,076
| 12–3
|- bgcolor="#ccffcc"
| 16
| December 3
| Philadelphia
| 
| Tony Parker (20)
| Tim Duncan (12)
| Tony Parker (7)
| SBC Center18,797
| 13–3
|- bgcolor="#ccffcc"
| 17
| December 5
| @ Orlando
| 
| Tim Duncan (26)
| Tim Duncan (12)
| Tony Parker (7)
| TD Waterhouse Centre14,661
| 14–3
|- bgcolor="#ccffcc"
| 18
| December 7
| Miami
| 
| Tim Duncan (28)
| Tim Duncan (16)
| Tony Parker (11)
| SBC Center18,797
| 15–3
|- bgcolor="#ccffcc"
| 19
| December 9
| Boston
| 
| Tim Duncan (20)
| Tim Duncan (11)
| Nick Van Exel (6)
| SBC Center18,797
| 16–3
|- bgcolor="#ffcccc"
| 20
| December 10
| @ Atlanta
| 
| Tony Parker (20)
| Manu Ginóbili, Tim Duncan (10)
| Michael Finley (6)
| Philips Arena16,678
| 16–4
|- bgcolor="#ccffcc"
| 21
| December 13
| L. A. Clippers
| 
| Tim Duncan (27)
| Tim Duncan (22)
| Tony Parker (7)
| SBC Center18,797
| 17–4
|- bgcolor="#ccffcc"
| 22
| December 15
| @ Minnesota
| 
| Michael Finley (21)
| Tim Duncan (9)
| Tony Parker (7)
| Target Center17,003
| 18–4
|- bgcolor="#ccffcc"
| 23
| December 17
| Sacramento
| 
| Tony Parker (25)
| Tim Duncan (14)
| Tony Parker (12)
| SBC Center18,797
| 19–4
|- bgcolor="#ffcccc"
| 24
| December 18
| @ New Orleans/Oklahoma City
| 
| Michael Finley, Tony Parker (17)
| Tim Duncan (8)
| Tony Parker (6)
| Ford Center19,297
| 19–5
|- bgcolor="#ffcccc"
| 25
| December 20
| @ Milwaukee
| 
| Tim Duncan (34)
| Tim Duncan (13)
| Tony Parker (11)
| Bradley Center16,865
| 19–6
|- bgcolor="#ccffcc"
| 26
| December 21
| @ New York
| 
| Michael Finley (19)
| Rasho Nesterovic, Nazr Mohammed, Robert Horry (5)
| Tony Parker (10)
| Madison Square Garden19,763
| 20–6
|- bgcolor="#ccffcc"
| 27
| December 23
| Toronto
| 
| Tim Duncan (27)
| Tim Duncan (10)
| Tim Duncan (8)
| SBC Center18,797
| 21–6
|- bgcolor="#ffcccc"
| 28
| December 25
| @ Detroit
| 
| Tony Parker (19)
| Tim Duncan (11)
| Tim Duncan (4)
| The Palace of Auburn Hills22,076
| 21–7
|- bgcolor="#ccffcc"
| 29
| December 27
| Indiana
| 
| Tony Parker (27)
| Tim Duncan (9)
| Tony Parker (6)
| SBC Center18,797
| 22–7
|- bgcolor="#ccffcc"
| 30
| December 29
| New Orleans/Oklahoma City
| 
| Michael Finley (18)
| Tim Duncan (7)
| Tony Parker (7)
| SBC Center18,797
| 23–7
|- bgcolor="#ccffcc"
| 31
| December 31
| @ Denver
| 
| Tim Duncan (25)
| Tim Duncan (10)
| Manu Ginóbili (8)
| Pepsi Center18,296
| 24–7

|- bgcolor="#ccffcc"
| 32
| January 4
| Portland
| 
| Tim Duncan, Tony Parker (18)
| Tim Duncan (13)
| Tony Parker (7)
| SBC Center18,797
| 25–7
|- bgcolor="#ccffcc"
| 33
| January 6
| Minnesota
| 
| Tony Parker (23)
| Tim Duncan (14)
| Tony Parker (7)
| SBC Center18,797
| 26–7
|- bgcolor="#ffcccc"
| 34
| January 7
| @ Phoenix
| 
| Tim Duncan, Manu Ginóbili (19)
| Tim Duncan (12)
| Tony Parker (6)
| America West Arena18,422
| 26–8
|- bgcolor="#ccffcc"
| 35
| January 10
| New Jersey
| 
| Tim Duncan (27)
| Tim Duncan (12)
| Bruce Bowen (5)
| SBC Center18,797
| 27–8
|- bgcolor="#ffcccc"
| 36
| January 12
| Detroit
| 
| Tim Duncan, Tony Parker (17)
| Tim Duncan (13)
| Michael Finley (3)
| SBC Center18,797
| 27–9
|- bgcolor="#ccffcc"
| 37
| January 14
| Memphis
| 
| Manu Ginóbili (20)
| Tim Duncan (13)
| Manu Ginóbili (7)
| SBC Center18,797
| 28–9
|- bgcolor="#ccffcc"
| 38
| January 16
| @ Memphis
| 
| Tony Parker (28)
| Tim Duncan (12)
| Manu Ginóbili (5)
| FedEx Forum18,119
| 29–9
|- bgcolor="#ccffcc"
| 39
| January 18
| Milwaukee
| 
| Tim Duncan (27)
| Tim Duncan (9)
| Tony Parker, Manu Ginóbili (7)
| SBC Center18,797
| 30–9
|- bgcolor="#ccffcc"
| 40
| January 20
| @ Miami
| 
| Tony Parker (38)
| Tim Duncan (11)
| Tony Parker, Manu Ginóbili (5)
| AmericanAirlines Arena20,287
| 31–9
|- bgcolor="#ffcccc"
| 41
| January 22
| Denver
| 
| Nazr Mohammed (17)
| Tim Duncan (13)
| Tony Parker (7)
| SBC Center18,797
| 31–10
|- bgcolor="#ccffcc"
| 42
| January 24
| Charlotte
| 
| Beno Udrih (17)
| Tim Duncan (9)
| Beno Udrih (8)
| SBC Center18,797
| 32–10
|- bgcolor="#ccffcc"
| 43
| January 25
| @ New Orleans/Oklahoma City
| 
| Tim Duncan (17)
| Bruce Bowen (8)
| Tony Parker (3)
| Ford Center19,289
| 33–10
|- bgcolor="#ccffcc"
| 44
| January 28
| Minnesota
| 
| Tim Duncan (28)
| Tim Duncan (16)
| Tony Parker (5)
| SBC Center18,797
| 34–10
|- bgcolor="#ccffcc"
| 45
| January 30
| @ Utah
| 
| Tim Duncan (19)
| Nazr Mohammed (9)
| Tony Parker (6)
| Delta Center19,384
| 35–10

|- bgcolor="#ccffcc"
| 46
| February 1
| @ Portland
| 
| Manu Ginóbili (22)
| Tim Duncan (17)
| Manu Ginóbili (4)
| Rose Garden Arena16,638
| 36–10
|- bgcolor="#ccffcc"
| 47
| February 2
| @ Golden State
| 
| Tony Parker (23)
| Tim Duncan (11)
| Beno Udrih, Tony Parker (6)
| Oakland Arena17,223
| 37–10
|- bgcolor="#ccffcc"
| 48
| February 8
| @ Toronto
| 
| Tony Parker (32)
| Rasho Nesterovic (8)
| Tony Parker (13)
| Air Canada Centre19,284
| 38–10
|- bgcolor="#ccffcc"
| 49
| February 10
| @ New Jersey
| 
| Manu Ginóbili (22)
| Tim Duncan (7)
| Tim Duncan, Tony Parker (6)
| Continental Airlines Arena19,096
| 39–10
|- bgcolor="#ccffcc"
| 50
| February 12
| @ Indiana
| 
| Manu Ginóbili (29)
| Tim Duncan (11)
| Tony Parker (6)
| Conseco Fieldhouse18,345
| 40–10
|- bgcolor="#ffcccc"
| 51
| February 13
| @ Cleveland
| 
| Tim Duncan (19)
| Tim Duncan (10)
| Tim Duncan (5)
| Gund Arena19,486
| 40–11
|- bgcolor="#ffcccc"
| 52
| February 15
| @ Philadelphia
| 
| Tony Parker (23)
| Nazr Mohammed (20)
| Manu Ginóbili (8)
| Wachovia Center17,335
| 40–12
|- align="center"
|colspan="9" bgcolor="#bbcaff"|All-Star Break
|- bgcolor="#ccffcc"
| 53
| February 21
| Seattle
| 
| Tony Parker (30)
| Tim Duncan (16)
| Tony Parker (6)
| SBC Center18,797
| 41–12
|- bgcolor="#ccffcc"
| 54
| February 24
| @ Memphis
| 
| Tim Duncan (19)
| Tim Duncan (16)
| Manu Ginóbili (4)
| FedEx Forum18,119
| 42–12
|- bgcolor="#ccffcc"
| 55
| February 25
| Golden State
| 
| Nazr Mohammed (15)
| Tim Duncan (16)
| Tony Parker (6)
| SBC Center18,797
| 43–12
|- bgcolor="#ccffcc"
| 56
| February 27
| New York
| 
| Michael Finley (22)
| Tim Duncan (7)
| Tony Parker (12)
| SBC Center18,797
| 44–12

|- bgcolor="#ccffcc"
| 57
| March 2
| Dallas
| 
| Tony Parker (23)
| Bruce Bowen (8)
| Tony Parker (4)
| SBC Center18,797
| 45–12
|- bgcolor="#ccffcc"
| 58
| March 4
| Portland
| 
| Tim Duncan (22)
| Tim Duncan (15)
| Tony Parker (5)
| SBC Center18,797
| 46–12
|- bgcolor="#ccffcc"
| 59
| March 6
| @ L. A. Lakers
| 
| Tony Parker, Manu Ginóbili, Michael Finley (21)
| Tim Duncan (7)
| Tim Duncan (9)
| Staples Center18,997
| 47–12
|- bgcolor="#ffcccc"
| 60
| March 7
| @ L. A. Clippers
| 
| Tony Parker (20)
| Tim Duncan (7)
| Tim Duncan (7)
| Staples Center18,409
| 47–13
|- bgcolor="#ccffcc"
| 61
| March 9
| @ Phoenix
| 
| Tony Parker (29)
| Nazr Mohammed (11)
| Brent Barry (7)
| America West Arena18,422
| 48–13
|- bgcolor="#ffcccc"
| 62
| March 10
| L. A. Lakers
| 
| Michael Finley, Brent Barry (16)
| Michael Finley (9)
| Manu Ginóbili (6)
| SBC Center18,797
| 48–14
|- bgcolor="#ccffcc"
| 63
| March 12
| Houston
| 
| Tim Duncan (20)
| Tim Duncan (10)
| Manu Ginóbili (5)
| SBC Center18,797
| 49–14
|- bgcolor="#ccffcc"
| 64
| March 14
| New Orleans/Oklahoma City
| 
| Tony Parker (20)
| Tim Duncan, Nazr Mohammed (8)
| Tony Parker (11)
| SBC Center18,797
| 50–14
|- bgcolor="#ccffcc"
| 65
| March 17
| Phoenix
| 
| Nazr Mohammed (30)
| Nazr Mohammed (16)
| Tim Duncan (7)
| SBC Center18,797
| 51–14
|- bgcolor="#ccffcc"
| 66
| March 18
| @ Houston
| 
| Tony Parker (23)
| Tim Duncan, Nazr Mohammed (8)
| Tony Parker (8)
| Toyota Center18,234
| 52–14
|- bgcolor="#ccffcc"
| 67
| March 21
| Golden State
| 
| Tony Parker (29)
| Tim Duncan (13)
| Tony Parker (7)
| SBC Center18,797
| 53–14
|- bgcolor="#ffcccc"
| 68
| March 22
| @ Denver
| 
| Manu Ginóbili (26)
| Tim Duncan (6)
| Tony Parker (6)
| Pepsi Center17,455
| 53–15
|- bgcolor="#ccffcc"
| 69
| March 24
| @ Portland
| 
| Brent Barry (23)
| Tim Duncan (7)
| Tim Duncan (6)
| Rose Garden Arena17,018
| 54–15
|- bgcolor="#ffcccc"
| 70
| March 26
| @ Seattle
| 
| Tim Duncan (28)
| Tim Duncan (10)
| Tony Parker (12)
| KeyArena16,861
| 54–16
|- bgcolor="#ccffcc"
| 71
| March 28
| @ L. A. Clippers
| 
| Tim Duncan, Michael Finley (20)
| Tim Duncan (13)
| Manu Ginóbili (9)
| Staples Center17,978
| 55–16
|- bgcolor="#ccffcc"
| 72
| March 30
| @ L. A. Lakers
| 
| Tim Duncan (20)
| Tim Duncan (13)
| Manu Ginóbili (6)
| Staples Center18,997
| 56–16

|- bgcolor="#ccffcc"
| 73
| April 1
| Washington
| 
| Tony Parker (28)
| Tim Duncan (14)
| Tony Parker (6)
| SBC Center18,797
| 57–16
|- bgcolor="#ccffcc"
| 74
| April 4
| Washington
| 
| Manu Ginóbili (26)
| Tim Duncan (13)
| Tony Parker (8)
| Delta Center18,064
| 58–16
|- bgcolor="#ffcccc"
| 75
| April 5
| Sacramento
| 
| Tony Parker (16)
| Nazr Mohammed (9)
| Tony Parker (5)
| SBC Center18,797
| 58–17
|- bgcolor="#ffcccc"
| 76
| April 7
| Dallas
| 
| Manu Ginóbili (22)
| Tim Duncan (9)
| Manu Ginóbili (4)
| SBC Center18,797
| 58–18
|- bgcolor="#ccffcc"
| 77
| April 9
| Memphis
| 
| Tim Duncan (23)
| Tim Duncan (12)
| Tim Duncan (5)
| SBC Center18,797
| 59–18
|- bgcolor="#ccffcc"
| 77
| April 9
| Memphis
| 
| Tim Duncan (23)
| Tim Duncan (12)
| Tim Duncan (5)
| SBC Center18,797
| 59–18
|- bgcolor="#ccffcc"
| 78
| April 11
| Memphis
| 
| Tony Parker (27)
| Tim Duncan (14)
| Tony Parker (9)
| SBC Center18,797
| 60–18
|- bgcolor="#ffcccc"
| 79
| April 13
| Orlando
| 
| Tim Duncan (31)
| Tim Duncan (13)
| Tim Duncan (6)
| SBC Center18,797
| 60–19
|- bgcolor="#ccffcc"
| 80
| April 16
| @ Minnesota
| 
| Beno Udrih (15)
| Tim Duncan (8)
| Bruce Bowen (5)
| Target Center15,231
| 61–19
|- bgcolor="#ccffcc"
| 81
| April 17
| Utah
| 
| Manu Ginóbili (18)
| Rasho Nesterovic (11)
| Nick Van Exel (6)
| SBC Center18,797
| 62–19
|- bgcolor="#ccffcc"
| 82
| April 19
| @ Houston
| 
| Brent Barry (19)
| Nazr Mohammed, Robert Horry (6)
| Manu Ginóbili (6)
| Toyota Center17,613
| 63–19

Playoffs

|- align="center" bgcolor="#ccffcc"
| 1
| April 22
| Sacramento
| W 122–88
| Tony Parker (25)
| Nazr Mohammed (17)
| Brent Barry (6)
| AT&T Center18,797
| 1–0
|- align="center" bgcolor="#ccffcc"
| 2
| April 25
| Sacramento
| W 128–119 (OT)
| Manu Ginóbili (32)
| Tim Duncan (13)
| Tony Parker (10)
| AT&T Center18,797
| 2–0
|- align="center" bgcolor="#ffcccc"
| 3
| April 28
| @ Sacramento
| L 93–94
| Tim Duncan (29)
| Tim Duncan (12)
| Tony Parker (6)
| ARCO Arena17,317
| 2–1
|- align="center" bgcolor="#ffcccc"
| 4
| April 30
| @ Sacramento
| L 84–102
| Tony Parker (22)
| Tim Duncan (8)
| Bruce Bowen (3)
| ARCO Arena17,317
| 2–2
|- align="center" bgcolor="#ccffcc"
| 5
| May 2
| Sacramento
| W 109–98
| Manu Ginóbili (27)
| Duncan, Ginóbili (9)
| Tim Duncan (5)
| AT&T Center18,797
| 3–2
|- align="center" bgcolor="#ccffcc"
| 6
| May 5
| @ Sacramento
| W 105–83
| Tony Parker (31)
| Robert Horry (7)
| Manu Ginóbili (5)
| ARCO Arena17,317
| 4–2
|-

|- align="center" bgcolor="#ccffcc"
| 1
| May 7
| Dallas
| W 87–85
| Tim Duncan (31)
| Tim Duncan (13)
| Duncan, Parker (4)
| AT&T Center18,797
| 1–0
|- align="center" bgcolor="#ffcccc"
| 2
| May 9
| Dallas
| L 91–113
| Tim Duncan (28)
| Tim Duncan (9)
| Tim Duncan (3)
| AT&T Center18,797
| 1–1
|- align="center" bgcolor="#ffcccc"
| 3
| May 13
| @ Dallas
| L 103–104
| Tim Duncan (35)
| Tim Duncan (12)
| Tony Parker (4)
| American Airlines Center20,865
| 1–2
|- align="center" bgcolor="#ffcccc"
| 4
| May 15
| @ Dallas
| L 118–123 (OT)
| Tony Parker (33)
| Tim Duncan (13)
| Tim Duncan (6)
| American Airlines Center20,969
| 1–3
|- align="center" bgcolor="#ccffcc"
| 5
| May 17
| Dallas
| W 98–97
| Tim Duncan (36)
| Tim Duncan (10)
| Manu Ginóbili (5)
| AT&T Center18,797
| 2–3
|- align="center" bgcolor="#ccffcc"
| 6
| May 19
| @ Dallas
| W 91–86
| Manu Ginóbili (30)
| Manu Ginóbili (10)
| Tony Parker (3)
| American Airlines Center20,986
| 3–3
|- align="center" bgcolor="#ffcccc"
| 7
| May 22
| Dallas
| L 111–119 (OT)
| Tim Duncan (41)
| Tim Duncan (15)
| Tim Duncan (6)
| AT&T Center
| 3–4
|-

Player statistics

Season

Playoffs

Awards and records
Tim Duncan, All-NBA Second Team
Bruce Bowen, NBA All-Defensive First Team
Tim Duncan, NBA All-Defensive Second Team

Transactions

References

San Antonio Spurs seasons
San Antonio
San Antonio
San Antonio